Tianhui may refer to:

Tianhui 1B, a Chinese earth observation satellite

Historical eras
Tianhui (天會, 957–973), era name used by the Northern Han emperors Liu Chengjun, Liu Ji'en and Liu Jiyuan
Tianhui (天會, 1123–1137), era name used by Emperor Taizong of Jin and Emperor Xizong of Jin